Karla Maříková (born 19 March 1981) is a Czech politician, who has sat as an MP in the Chamber of Deputies for Freedom and Direct Democracy (SPD) since 2017.

Maříková graduated from a medical college in Karlovy Vary and worked as a nurse. In the 2017 elections, she was elected to parliament as the lead candidate for SPD in the Karlovy Vary Region. Since 2018, she has also been a municipal councilor in Ostrov.

References

1981 births
Living people
21st-century Czech politicians
Freedom and Direct Democracy MPs
Members of the Chamber of Deputies of the Czech Republic (2017–2021)
People from Ostrov (Karlovy Vary District)
Members of the Chamber of Deputies of the Czech Republic (2021–2025)